
Year 169 BC was a year of the pre-Julian Roman calendar. At the time it was known as the Year of the Consulship of Philippus and Caepio (or, less frequently, year 585 Ab urbe condita). The denomination 169 BC for this year has been used since the early medieval period, when the Anno Domini calendar era became the prevalent method in Europe for naming years.

Events
By place
Greece
 Macedonian forces led by Perseus of Macedon trap a Roman army led by Consul Quintus Marcius Phillipus near Tempe, but the Macedonians fail to take advantage of their resulting superior tactical position.
 King Perseus asks the Seleucid King Antiochus IV to join forces with him against the danger that Rome presents to all of the Hellenic monarchs. Antiochus IV does not respond.

Roman Republic
 Lex Voconia (The Voconian Law) is introduced in Rome by the tribune, Quintus Voconius Saxa, with the support of Cato the Elder. This law prohibits those who own property valued at 100,000 sesterces from making a woman their heir.

Births 
 Liu Fei, Chinese prince of the Han Dynasty. He is also the son of Emperor Jing and a half-brother of Emperor Wu (d. 128 BC)

Deaths 
 Quintus Ennius, Roman epic poet, dramatist, and satirist, the most influential of the early Latin poets – and often called the founder of Roman literature or the father of Roman poetry. His epic Annales, a poem telling the story of Rome from the wanderings of Aeneas to Ennius' own time, remains the national epic until it is later eclipsed by Virgil's Aeneid.

References